The Concordant Domain of the Outlands features in the cosmology of the Dungeon & Dragons game.

Outlands may also refer to:
Kingdom of the Outlands, a regional designation used within the Society for Creative Anachronism
Outlands (magazine), a 1946 English science-fiction magazine which ran for only one issue
Outlands, Staffordshire, a village in England
Outlands, a 2013 web series on Geek & Sundry
an English translation of the Frisian toponym Uthlande
Western Outlands, English translation of a Bulgarian toponym

See also
Outer Lands
Outlander (disambiguation)
Outland (disambiguation)